Gungun Uprari is an Indian actress who appears in Hindi TV shows. Gungun Uprari is known for her roles in serials like Bandhan Saat Janamon Ka, Rakt Sambandh, Haar Jeet,  Buddha and Jo Biwi Se Kare Pyaar.

Early life
Gungun Uprari is from Lucknow, Uttar Pradesh. She has a degree in mass communication. Her father is a retired banker and mother is house wife. Gungun Uprari has two sisters and both are lecturers in a college. She is married to Vinod Uprari and has a 10-year-old daughter whose name is Pari.

Television

Web series

References

External links 
 
Articles about Gungun Uprari on Times of India

Actresses from Lucknow
Indian soap opera actresses
Indian television actresses
Living people
People from Almora
21st-century Indian actresses
Actresses in Hindi television
Year of birth missing (living people)